= Odborové sdružení křesťanského dělnictva =

Odborové sdružení křesťanského dělnictva v ČSR ('Trade Union Association of Christian Workers in the Czechoslovak Republic') was a trade union centre in the First Czechoslovak Republic. By the mid-1920s, its affiliated unions had a combined membership of 81,846. The organization was linked to the Czechoslovak People's Party The organization had its headquarter in Brno.
